Selangor FM (stylised as SELANGOR fm) is a regional Malay language-radio station operated by Radio Televisyen Malaysia out of the Selangor state station in Angkasapuri. Broadcasts are daily from 06:00 until 00:00 featuring local news as well as Malay and international music. It transmits on FM 100.9 MHz from the Gunung Ulu Kali transmitter site and can be heard in Selangor, Kuala Lumpur, the northern part of Negeri Sembilan, the southern part of Perak and the western part of Pahang. It  also can be heard using rtmklik application in mobile phone.

Etymology 
The station was formerly known as Radio Malaysia Selangor (RMS) and before that as Radio Malaysia Central Area and Radio 3 Shah Alam.

Organisation Information

List of Segments

Controversy

Forced to move out from present location 
On 12 April 2008, the new Menteri Besar of Selangor, Tan Sri Khalid Ibrahim, warned the radio station to come up with a weekly one-hour slot to deliver the information about the programmes held by the State Government, or move out from the Sultan Abdul Aziz Shah Building which also houses the State Government's administration centre. The radio station was given a one-week deadline to perform the State Government's request. However, the radio station refused to allocate the weekly one-hour slot as requested. As a result, the Information Minister of Malaysia, Datuk Ahmad Shabery Cheek urged the radio station to move out and operate at the Angkasapuri instead, stating that RTM is not afraid of such warning.

References

External links 

 

Radio stations in Malaysia
Mass media in Shah Alam
Radio Televisyen Malaysia